Béla Petrovics is a Hungarian sprint canoer who competed in the late 1980s and early 1990s. He won three bronze medals at the ICF Canoe Sprint World Championships (K-2 1000 m: 1990, 1991; K-4 500 m: 1990).

References

Hungarian male canoeists
Living people
Year of birth missing (living people)
ICF Canoe Sprint World Championships medalists in kayak
20th-century Hungarian people